Jitka Veselá (born 9 August 1980, Schönfeldová) is a former professional tennis player from the Czech Republic.

Biography
A right-handed player from Prague, Schönfeldová was a top junior player, finishing 1996 as the joint ITF World Champion for girls' doubles, with regular partner Michaela Paštiková. The pair teamed up to win the 1996 Australian Open and also claimed the Orange Bowl title that year.

Schönfeldová's only main draw appearance on the WTA Tour came at the 1996 Czech Open, where she and Alena Vašková competed as qualifiers. Injuries limited her professional career and she left the tour in 2000.

After retiring from professional tennis, Schönfeldová played collegiate tennis in the United States, first at Flagler College in Florida, before joining the University of Georgia in 2004, where she studied journalism.

ITF finals

Singles (2–1)

Doubles (0–1)

References

External links
 
 
 https://prima.iprima.cz/prostreno/v-prostreno-je-vitezka-australian-open

1980 births
Living people
Czech female tennis players
Australian Open (tennis) junior champions
Georgia Lady Bulldogs tennis players
Tennis players from Prague
Grand Slam (tennis) champions in girls' doubles